Cadiz Dispatch was launched at Liverpool in 1785. Until 1791 she traded between London and Spain. From 1791 she made two voyages as a slave ship. On the second she was subject first to a maritime incident and then to an unsuccessful slave insurrection. Still, she delivered her cargo of slaves to St Vincent. She was condemned at Tortola on her way home.

Career
Cadiz Dispatch first appeared in Lloyd's Register in 1786, but with little information.

On 19 September 1788 Lloyd's List (LL) reported that Cadiz Dispatch, Harris, master, had developed a leak while at anchor in the bay. Some of the cargo was damaged. She was on a voyage from London to Cadiz.

Until 1791 she traded between London and Spain. Then in 1792 she started in the slave trade.

1st slave voyage (1791–1792): Captain I. Higgins sailed from London on 1 March 1791. Cadiz Dispatch acquired her slaves in Gabon. She arrived at Saint Ann's Bay, Jamaica on 18 April 1792 with 140 slaves. She arrived back at London on 7 July 1792.

Cadiz Dispatch last appeared in LR in 1793.

2nd slave voyage (1792–1795): Captain Baldy sailed from London on 31 October 1792. LL reported on 7 December that Cadiz Dispatch, Baldy, master, had been on her way from Rotterdam to Africa and the West Indies when she developed a leak at latitude 46° 48' North. She had arrived at Plymouth on 4 December but the wind was too strong for to enter the harbour; arrived at Portsmouth on 7 December with five feet of water in her hold. 

On 13 September 1793, LL reported that in May Cadiz Dispatch, Baldy, master, had 132 slaves aboard who had carried her away, i.e., taken possession of her. It also reported that Baldy and his crew, the chief mate expected, had been saved. The insurrection failed, but it is not clear how British slave traders regained control of Cadiz Dispatch. Apparently they did so while she was still in Africa. She received a new master and gathered more slaves.

Cadiz Packet, Kitson, master, arrived at St Vincent from Africa in December 1794 with 158 slaves.

Fate
In June 1795 LL reported that Cadiz Dispatch, Kitson, master, was condemned at Tortola as she was on her way from St Vincent to London. The vessel and her cargo were advertised for sale.

Citations and references
Citations

References

1785 ships
Age of Sail merchant ships of England
London slave ships
Captured ships
Maritime incidents in 1792
Maritime incidents involving slave ships